Türk Ekonomi Bankası (TEB; English: Turkish Economy Bank) is one of Turkey’s oldest financial institutions. In addition to providing its customers with corporate, SME, commercial, treasury & capital market, retail, and private banking products and services, TEB also supplies investment, leasing, factoring, and portfolio management financial services and products through its subsidiaries and group companies. TEB is a bank that provides consumer loans, vehicle loans, housing loans and commercial loans.

Originally established in the city of İzmit in 1927 as a privately-owned joint-stock company with the name Kocaeli Halk Bankası TAŞ, in 2005 TEB entered into a strategic partnership with BNP Paribas, a leading euro area banking group.

TEB was one of the first banks in Turkey to invest in mobile banking. The bank’s investments in this business line were centered around its CEPTETEB platform, a mobile application that introduced many innovations not just in the Turkish banking industry but throughout the world when it was released in 2008. Given a makeover in 2015, CEPTETEB became the primary mobile banking channel for TEB’s retail customers. In early 2020, TEB introduced CEPTETEB İŞTE (“CEPTETEB For Business”), a version of the app specifically designed for its SME, corporate, and microbusiness banking customers. The rapidly-won success of CEPTETEB İŞTE earned the app an award in the “Mobile” category of the “Innovation in Digital Banking Awards” series organized by The Banker','' an international financial affairs monthly owned by The Financial Times.

The first bank in Turkey to enter the private banking business line, TEB has been providing its high-net-worth customers with private banking and asset management products and services since 1989.

Having first entered the SME banking business line in 2005, in 2019 TEB overhauled its SME banking business model in order to better address the changing and increasingly more diversified requirements of SME customers through market segmentation focusing on such customers’ particular needs. Firms requiring specialized services for example are provided with bespoke services ranging from foreign trade to project finance and from derivatives trading to supplier financing. The bank’s digital service model was also revised both to make it easier for smaller businesses to take care of their day-to-day banking needs and to automate credit-allocation processes. Having entered the SME banking business line with the intention of acting as such customers’ financial adviser, TEB’s success has been recognized by the International Finance Corporation, a member of the World Bank Group, which cited TEB as one of the world’s three best banks active in SME banking.

Another business line in which TEB is active is startup business banking.

TEB Corporate Banking focuses on providing large-scale national and international firms, corporate groups, and holding companies with high-added-value corporate banking products and services. In this business line, TEB supplies such customers with foreign trade finance, operating and investment loans, working capital and investment-financing loans, cash-management and risk-management products, standard and derivatives products, corporate investment banking products, and commodity financing and project financing services.

As of end-2019, TEB had about nine thousand employees on its payroll and was serving customers through extensive branch and ATM networks, its CEPTETEB and CEPTETEB İŞTE mobile apps, an online banking website, and a call center.

TEB is a partner in American financial company Bank of America's International ATM Partnership.

Three TEB subsidiaries offer services:TEB Faktoring AŞ is one of the most active players in Turkey’s factoring industry and has been providing corporate and commercial firms as well as SMEs with export, import, and domestic factoring products and services since 1997.TEB Portföy Yönetimi AŞ is an asset management company that has been in business since 1999.TEB Yatırım Menkul Değerler AŞ', which commenced operations in 1996, is a brokerage house that carries out capital market transactions on behalf of customers in accordance with the requirements of Turkish capital market laws and regulations.

References

Sources 
 

Turkish brands
Turkish companies established in 1927
Companies based in Istanbul
Banks of Turkey
Banks established in 1927
BNP Paribas